The Morristown Line is an NJ Transit commuter rail line connecting Morris and Essex counties to New York City, via either New York Penn Station or Hoboken Terminal. Out of 60 inbound and 58 outbound daily weekday trains, 28 inbound and 26 outbound Midtown Direct trains (about 45%) use the Kearny Connection (opened June 10, 1996) to Penn Station; the rest go to Hoboken. Passengers can transfer at Newark Broad Street or Summit to reach the other destination. On rail system maps the line is colored dark green, and its symbol is a drum, a reference to Morristown's history during the American Revolution.

There is frequent service weekdays, with hourly service to/from New York (none going beyond Dover) on weekends. Until August 13, 2006, there was also hourly service to Hoboken. On that date, service between Hoboken and Summit was cut back to once every two hours on weekends. On May 11, 2008, off-peak weekday Hoboken-Dover trains (600 Series) were cut. In addition, weekend Gladstone trains were cut back to Summit, and a shuttle train is operated every two hours between Newark Broad Street and Hoboken Terminal.

Recently the line between Millburn and Summit underwent extensive rehabilitation. This included the replacement of the creosote crossties on both tracks with concrete crossties, the replacement of all crossties on the double trestle over Short Hills Avenue, and the replacement of several sections of rail. More recently work has been progressing briskly on rehabilitating both tracks between Summit and Dover with concrete crossties and new welded rail, and rehabilitation of select road overpasses.

Hurricane Sandy inflicted severe damage on the Morristown Line on October 29–30, 2012, as fallen trees brought down catenary and signal wires and washed out sections of track, most notably through the New Jersey Meadowlands on both the main line and the Kearny Connection. Midtown Direct service was restored from Dover to New York on November 12, 2012; service to Hoboken and west of Dover resumed on November 19.

Description

The Morristown Line begins at Hoboken Terminal or at New York Penn Station. Trains departing for points west of Dover require diesel locomotives. Immediately after leaving Hoboken, the route passes the coach and diesel yards before entering the 1908 Bergen Tunnel under the New Jersey Palisades just past the East End interlocking. At the west portal of the Bergen Tunnel is West End interlocking, where the Main Line, Bergen County Line and Pascack Valley Line branch off to the north. The Morristown Line then crosses over Lower Hack Lift, a vertical lift bridge built in 1927 over the Hackensack River. The line crosses under Route 7 and then passes NJ Transit's Meadowlands Maintenance Complex (MMC).

Amtrak's Northeast Corridor and the New Jersey Turnpike cross overhead. The Midtown Direct trains join the Morristown line from New York at Kearny Jct. just past this overpass. The Morristown Line parallels the Amtrak Northeast Corridor and PATH lines and Interstate 280 for a short distance here. The Waterfront Connection is just prior to the overpass at Meadows interlocking. It allows selected North Jersey Coast Line and Raritan Valley Line trains to reach Hoboken from the Northeast Corridor Line.

After following Interstate 280, the line crosses a 2-track swing bridge, the Morristown Line Bridge (Newark Drawbridge) over the Passaic River into the renovated Newark Broad Street station with two high platforms serving all three tracks. After Newark Broad Street Station, within the city limits the line runs in a cut and crosses under many streets, Interstate 280 and the Newark City Subway, and at the abandoned Roseville Avenue station, now the location of Roseville interlocking, the Montclair-Boonton Line splits off to the right. The route west from Passaic River to a short distance to the east of Millburn station is triple tracked. The remainder of the route to Lake Hopatcong station is double tracked.

After passing an abandoned station at Grove Street (now the location of Green interlocking) and over the Garden State Parkway, East Orange is the next stop, on a viaduct. Brick Church and Orange follow, also elevated stations. The line curves south over Interstate 280 past Highland Avenue and Mountain Station. South Orange is next, an elevated station with two platforms and three tracks. Seton Hall University is located here. Maplewood follows, with a side platform and a center platform serving all westbound and some eastbound trains. After Maplewood the line narrows to two tracks at Millburn interlocking. Millburn and Short Hills have two side platforms, with two tracks.

Summit, a major station is next with two high platforms and the station building above the tracks. A glass crossover passes above the platforms. Some weekday locals terminate and originate here. Many of the area's private schools are located in Summit and commuting high school students are a major source of traffic for this station. Schedules are timed for most Morristown trains to have a convenient transfer to a Gladstone branch train across the platform.

Just west of Summit the Gladstone Branch separates and the line crosses over the Passaic River (the second time) into Chatham. Chatham station is on an embankment with two side platforms. Madison on a viaduct is similar, with a recently refurbished 1916 station house on the eastbound side.

The line passes its first grade crossing at Convent Station at Saint Elizabeth University. This station has two side platforms with the station building on the eastbound side and a brick waiting house on the westbound track. An old freight station is on the eastbound side. After this station there are two more grade crossings.

Crossing Interstate 287 the line enters Morristown. The Morristown station has two low side platforms and a large station building open 7 days, and is the focal point of a new transit village development. Mini-high level platform ramps for ADA access at  both ends. An abandoned freight station is at the west end. West of the station, the Morristown & Erie Railway's main office are located. The Morristown & Erie's main line diverges at this point.

The next station on the line is Morris Plains, with a 1915 brick station. A local model railroad club is located in the freight house just north of the station. After Morris Plains the line curves through wooded areas, under Route 10, and past several crossings before stopping at Mount Tabor, a small stop in Denville near the community of the same name in Parsippany located at a grade crossing. This stop is served by selected weekday and limited weekend trains and lacks an eastbound platform.

Denville station is a short distance from Mount Tabor. The Morristown Line rejoins the Montclair-Boonton Line just past this station.

The line passes over Estling Lake and alongside the Rockaway River into Dover.  Dover, the final stop in electric territory, is next. The 1905 station was recently renovated in the mid-1990s and has a single high platform. Since the electric wiring ends near here, this is the last stop for most NJ Transit trains: as of 2022 all Midtown Direct Morristown Lines are exclusively electric, though this may change if NJ Transit purchases more dual mode locomotives and assigns them to Midtown Direct service on the Morristown line; also, most Hoboken trains on the Morristown line are electric due to its better efficiency and performance. Only a few Hoboken diesels continue west towards Hackettstown. The Morristown Line catenary wires end about a half-mile west of the station near the US Route 46 overpass. However, there are plans (currently unfunded) to extend the electric service to Lake Hopatcong as the Dover Yard is at capacity, and the substation at Wharton to supply this extension has been in service since 1984.
  
Two tracks continue west over the Rockaway River and past D&R Junction in Wharton where Morris County's Dover-Rockaway Branch splits off. Chester (Lake) Junction is on the left and provides the connection to Morris County's Chester and High Bridge Branch. Mount Arlington park/ride station is next, with two high platforms and 285 parking spaces near Exit 30 on Interstate 80.After passing under Interstate 80, Lake Hopatcong station is next. The connection to the Lackawanna Cutoff is on the right as the train approaches Port Morris Yard, where the Montclair-Boonton and Morristown line's diesel fleet is based. Netcong station has a brick house on the low platform. Until late 1994, this was the endpoint of the line. Crossing under Interstate 80, the line enters the Mount Olive International Trade Center, where a station is located at Waterloo Valley Road.
The route passes through Allamuchy Mountain State Park and along the Musconetcong River to Hackettstown. A freight spur to the M&M/Mars plant is on the right, before the line crosses US Route 46 in downtown. The Hackettstown station is shortly ahead, with one low platform and a mini-high ADA ramp. Trackage south of Hackettstown is owned by Norfolk Southern and operated by the Dover and Delaware River Railroad as part of the Lackawanna Washington Secondary to Phillipsburg.

The Morristown line is the main line of the historic Lackawanna Railroad. Until 1970, passenger service continued beyond Lake Hopatcong, to the Poconos, Scranton, Binghamton and Buffalo via the Lackawanna Cut-Off.  Service on the Cut-Off as far as Andover is slated to begin again sometime after 2025 with completion of the first phase of the Lackawanna Cut-Off Restoration Project. Future plans include possibly extending rail service into northeastern Pennsylvania, perhaps as far as Scranton.

Electrification
The Morristown Line east of Dover station is electrified, using 25 kV, 60 Hz AC overhead catenary wire.  The line was electrified in 1930 at 3 kV DC, but was re-electrified in 1984 at the contemporary standard of 25 kV, 60 Hz.  The connecting Gladstone Branch and Montclair Branch were also re-electrified at this time.

Rolling stock
Weekday local service between Hoboken and Dover now is mainly diesel (electric if the locomotive is an ALP-45DP or ALP-46), with occasional Arrow III electric MU cars. All Midtown Direct service is push-pull, utilizing electric ALP-46 locomotives or dual-mode ALP-45DP locomotives and Comet or Multilevel coaches. Through service west of Dover from Hoboken uses GP40PH-2 or PL42AC diesels or the ALP-45DP dual-power locomotive (runs electric east of Dover, diesel west of Dover) with Comet cars.

Stations

References

Bibliography

External links
 NJ Transit (including Morris & Essex Line) Timetables

Passenger rail transportation in New Jersey
NJ Transit Rail Operations
Transportation in Essex County, New Jersey
Transportation in Morris County, New Jersey
Transportation in Union County, New Jersey
Transportation in Hudson County, New Jersey
Delaware, Lackawanna and Western Railroad lines